Gunturodu is a 2017 Telugu-language action comedy film, produced by Sree Varun Atluri on Claps & Whistles Entertainments banner and directed by S.K. Satya. Starring Manchu Manoj, Pragya Jaiswal  and music composed by DJ Vasanth.It released on 3 March 2017 to highly negative reviews and bombed at the box office

Plot
Kanna is a slacker of Guntur, who passes the time hanging out with his group of friends. So, his father Suryanarayana decides to get him married to set him on the right path. After his engagement, Kanna falls in love with his fiancée's friend Amrutha, so he creates a mess and cancels the engagement. After a few funny incidents, Amrutha also begins to love him.

Seshu is a leading criminal lawyer who is a highly short-tempered and egotistic person. One day, at a party, a tiff arises and Kanna brutally assaults Seshu after Seshu asks Kanna and his friends to vacate the party. Since Kanna has cake cream on his face they don't recognize him. Seshu orders his men to find out and kill him at any cost. Things become complicated day by day when Seshu starts targeting Kanna and his father Suryanarayana. The situation escalates when Kanna learns that Amrutha is Seshu's sister. The rest of the story is about how Kanna escapes from Seshu's target and succeeds in his love.

Cast
Manchu Manoj as Kanna
Pragya Jaiswal as Amrutha
Rajendra Prasad as Suryanarayana
Sampath Raj as Criminal Lawyer Seshu
Kota Srinivasa Rao as MLA Koteswara Rao 
Rao Ramesh as Minister Krishna Rao
Prudhviraj as Babu Rao 
Kasi Viswanath as Suryanarayana's friend
Praveen as Kanna's friend
Satya as Kanna's friend
Raja Ravindra as Inspector Ramesh
Bhanu Sri as Amrutha's friend
Shakalaka Shankar

Soundtrack

Music composed by DJ Vasanth. The music released on Mango Music Company. The audio launch function was held on 29 January 2017 at JRC Convention Center in Hyderabad.

References

External links
 

2017 directorial debut films
2017 masala films
Indian action comedy films
2017 action comedy films
2010s Telugu-language films